Herbert Hermansson  (1906–1984) was a Swedish politician. He was a member of the Centre Party.

References
This article was initially translated from the Swedish Wikipedia article.

Centre Party (Sweden) politicians
1906 births
1984 deaths
20th-century Swedish politicians